Crenicichla hu is a species of cichlid native to South America. It is found in Argentina.

References

Piálek, L., O. Říčan, J. Casciotta and A, Almirón, 2010. Crenicichla hu, a new species of cichlid fish (Teleostei: Cichlidae) from the Paraná basin in Misiones, Argentina. Zootaxa 2537:33-46.

hu
Fish of Argentina
Taxa named by Lubomír Piálek
Taxa named by Oldřich Říčan
Taxa named by Jorge Rafael Casciotta
Taxa named by Adriana Edith Almirón
Fish described in 2010